Kesheh is a village in North Tarq Rud Rural District, in the Central District of Natanz County, Isfahan Province, Iran. Its population was determined to be 675, in 242 families, during the Statistical Center of Iran's 2006 census.

References 

The first private solar panels in the area of Natanz were installed in the village to produce power in the area of Asbar.

Populated places in Natanz County